Devon Joseph Werkheiser (born March 8, 1991) is an American actor and musician. As an actor, Werkheiser is known for his starring role as Ned Bigby on the Nickelodeon sitcom Ned's Declassified School Survival Guide, and for his role as the lead character Nolan Byrd in the 2007 Nickelodeon television movie Shredderman Rules. Werkheiser also played Peter Parkes in the fourth and final season of the ABC Family series Greek.

Early life 
Werkheiser was born in Atlanta, Georgia, and raised in Johns Creek, Georgia. His parents enrolled him in acting classes at the Talent Factory, a local children’s acting program.

Career

Acting 
After landing a minor role in We Were Soldiers, Werkheiser and his mother moved to Los Angeles to pursue his acting career. In 2003, he had a main role as Max Korda in the TV movie Recipe for Disaster. Since his arrival in Hollywood, Werkheiser has landed several television and film roles, the biggest of which is that of Ned Bigby on Ned's Declassified School Survival Guide. Werkheiser lent his voice in movies such as: Casper's Scare School the voice of as Casper the Friendly Ghost, Casper's Shadow, and Good Dragon and The Wizzard of Krudd as the voice of Gordo.

In 2007, Werkheiser starred in a Nickelodeon movie based on Wendelin Van Draanen's Shredderman book series Shredderman Rules as Nolan Byrd/Shredderman. Later that year, Werkheiser played the role of Chris Marino in Lifetime original movie Christmas in Paradise. In 2009, Werkheiser starred as Victor in the movie The First Time. He played the role of Victor, who has an incurable crush on hot senior Anya, who is way out of his league and she doesn't have a clue he exists. He also had a significant role in the movie The Prankster, in which he played the role of Brad Burris.

In 2011, Werkheiser played the role of Danny in the horror thriller movie Beneath the Darkness. In 2012, he played the lead role of Cassidy Warren in web series Never Fade Away. In 2013 Werkheiser starred as Max in the horror film The Wicked. He played the supporting role of Brett in Lifetime movie Zephyr Springs also known as Deadly Spa. In 2014, Werkheiser starred as Nick Behrle in the movie California Scheming and had a role as Fitch in the movie Helicopter Mom.

In 2016, Werkheiser starred as Jason in the television movie Bad Sister, which premiered on Lifetime on January 4, 2016; in the movie his character is stalked by the school's newest nun. He hosted DanceOn's first competition series Dance-Off Juniors on free mobile-streaming service Go90, which premiered on April 20, 2016. In summer 2016, Werkheiser starred as Logan in the romantic comedy film Sundown directed by Fernando Librrija and co-starring Camilla Belle, Sean Marquette, and Sara Paxton. On December 5, 2016, he guest starred in an episode of 2 Broke Girls. In 2017, Werkheiser played the role of Brock in the comedy film Where's the Money alongside Andrew Bachelor and Logan Paul. 

In 2018, he had a supporting role as Joey in the indie crime drama Break Night and played the role of a judge in the dance film To The Beat! alongside Alyson Stoner. Werkheriser played the role of Charlie in the web mini-series Rough Draft, which was released on YouTube on February 11, 2019. Werkheiser played the supporting role of Floyd Stiles in the crime film Crown Vic. In 2019, Werkheiser starred as Sam in the romantic comedy film Santa Girl alongside Jennifer Stone. 

In 2021, Werkheiser was a member of the cast in the film Rust, when production was suspended after a prop gun held by Alec Baldwin unintentionally discharged, resulting in the death of cinematographer Halyna Hutchins. Production on the film was later scheduled to resume in early 2023.

In February 2023, Werkheiser started a podcast called Ned's Declassified Podcast Survival Guide with Lindsey Shaw and Daniel Curtis Lee under the network PodCo.

Music 

Werkheiser was signed with Universal Motown, however his label status on Myspace later changed to unsigned. He performed live shows with female vocalists Kristen Marie Hollyin and Britney Christian.

His first single, "If Eyes Could Speak", was released April 1, 2010 on iTunes. The official music video was released via YouTube on June 15, 2010. It stars himself and his partner at the time, Molly McCook. His second single, "Sparks Will Fly", was released July 29, 2010 on iTunes.

He released his first EP I Am on June 25, 2013. On June 9, 2015, he released his second EP Here and Now. On January 3, 2016, Werkheiser released the single "Stuck On the Ground". He released the single "Fire" on January 22, 2016. On January 29, 2016, Werkheiser released a stripped version of "Stuck on the Ground".

On April 23, 2020, he released his third EP Chapter One, which consists of five songs.

Filmography

Film

Television

Discography

Studio albums

Extended plays

Singles

Other appearances
All of the following were only released on Myspace.

Awards and nominations

References

External links

1991 births
American male child actors
American male film actors
American male television actors
Living people
Male actors from Atlanta
Male actors from Georgia (U.S. state)
American child singers
American male pop singers
21st-century American male actors
Musicians from Atlanta
21st-century American singers
21st-century American male singers